The Rockfords were an American rock band formed in Seattle, Washington, in 1999 by Carrie Akre, Chris Friel, and Danny Newcomb of Goodness, Mike McCready of Pearl Jam, and Rick Friel of Jodie Watts. The group served as a side project for its members, who had already tasted success with their respective bands.

History 
Chris Friel, Rick Friel, Danny Newcomb, and Mike McCready were originally members of the band Shadow during the mid-1980s in Seattle, Washington. After a couple of attempts at breaking into the Los Angeles, California music scene, the group broke up and the band members went their separate ways. McCready would go on to co-form Pearl Jam in 1990 and Chris Friel and Danny Newcomb would go on to be a part of the band Goodness. Sometime as early as June 20, 1998, Chris Friel and Danny Newcomb of Goodness would invite McCready to play with Goodness onstage prior to a Pearl Jam set. They soon decided afterward to put a band together with Rick Friel and Goodness vocalist Carrie Akre. They named themselves The Rockfords, after one of McCready's favorite TV shows The Rockford Files.

The band's debut album, The Rockfords, was released on February 1, 2000, through Epic Records. Produced by John Goodmanson, it featured vocalist/guitarist Nancy Wilson (of Heart) contributing guest vocals on the track "Riverwide". Theresa E. LaVeck of AllMusic called the album a "compelling, if uneven, collaborative effort". The band members would go back to their regular work for some time after playing at least five shows together in the Seattle area in 2000.

In 2003, the band got together again, playing several more shows around Seattle and writing several new songs. A live album, Live Seattle, WA 12/13/03, was released in 2003 through Kufala Recordings. An EP containing the new songs, Waiting... (again produced by Goodmanson), was released in 2004.

In 2021 the band secured the rights to their debut album, and it was re-released on digital platforms in January 2022.

Band members 

Carrie Akre – vocals
Chris Friel – drums
Rick Friel – bass
Mike McCready – guitar
Danny Newcomb – guitar

Discography

Studio albums

Live albums

Extended plays

Singles

Other appearances

References

External links 

Alternative rock groups from Washington (state)
Epic Records artists
Musical groups disestablished in 2003
Musical groups established in 1999
Musical groups from Seattle
Musical quintets
1999 establishments in Washington (state)